In April, 1816, John McLean (DR) of  resigned.  A special election was called to fill the resulting vacancy.

Election results

Harrison took his seat on December 2, 1816

See also
List of special elections to the United States House of Representatives

References

Ohio 01
1816 01
Ohio 1816 01
1816 Ohio elections
[[Category:1816 United States House of Representatives 
United States House of Representatives 1816 01